Juan Carlos Stevens (born October 22, 1968 in Santiago de Cuba) is an athlete from Cuba, who competes in archery.

2008 Summer Olympics
At the 2008 Summer Olympics in Beijing Stevens finished his ranking round with a total of 659 points, which made him the 28th seed for the final competition bracket.  He faced Calvin Hartley in the first round, where he beat the archer from South Africa. Both archers scored 107 points in the regular match, but in the extra round Stevens scored 19 points and Hartley scored 18 points. Stevens went on to reach the quarter finals by beating Alexandru Bodnar (108-101) and Alan Wills (108-104). In the quarter finals he also scored 108 points, but his opponent Park Kyung-Mo did the same and they had to go into the extra round which the South Korean won with 19-17.

2012 Summer Olympics
At the 2012 Summer Olympics Stevens faced India's Tarundeep Rai in the first round, losing 6-5.

References

External links
 
 

1968 births
Living people
Sportspeople from Santiago de Cuba
Cuban male archers
Cuban people of British descent
Archers at the 2000 Summer Olympics
Archers at the 2007 Pan American Games
Archers at the 2008 Summer Olympics
Archers at the 2011 Pan American Games
Archers at the 2012 Summer Olympics
Archers at the 2015 Pan American Games
Archers at the 2019 Pan American Games
Olympic archers of Cuba
Pan American Games silver medalists for Cuba
Pan American Games bronze medalists for Cuba
Pan American Games medalists in archery
Central American and Caribbean Games gold medalists for Cuba
Central American and Caribbean Games bronze medalists for Cuba
Competitors at the 2006 Central American and Caribbean Games
Competitors at the 2014 Central American and Caribbean Games
Archers at the 1999 Pan American Games
Central American and Caribbean Games medalists in archery
Medalists at the 1999 Pan American Games
Medalists at the 2007 Pan American Games
Medalists at the 2011 Pan American Games